Poison Ivy II: Lily is a 1996 American direct-to-video erotic thriller film directed by Anne Goursaud, written by Chloe King and stars Alyssa Milano. It is a sequel to the 1992 film Poison Ivy and the second installment of the Poison Ivy film series.

Plot
Lily is a sheltered art student from Michigan attending college in California. She finds an apartment, and she soon notices that her roommates, Tanya (a friendly lesbian artist who becomes a good friend to Lily), Bridgette (a cruel and taunting artist who initially takes an immediate dislike to her), and Robert (the silent but talented musician), all art students, aren't quite normal.

One day, Lily discovers a box of items belonging to Ivy, a girl that she has never met before. In the box, she finds nude pictures of the girl and her diary. She is soon drawn to the content, also desiring to have the girl's sexual confidence and fearlessness. In class, she has trouble expressing herself, unlike Gredin, an attractive co-student and sculptor whom she soon starts dating. Meanwhile, she has found a job, babysitting Daphna, the daughter of her art teacher Donald Falk, who betrayed his wife and had sex with other women.

Slowly, Lily becomes obsessed with Ivy's letters and photos and attempts to take over her image. She cuts her hair and starts wearing more revealing clothes. Gredin grows even more attracted to her, and they begin a sexual  relationship. He is unamused by the amount of private time that she spends with Donald, but she explains that it's because of the babysitting. She inspires Donald to perform art again, having noticed that he's been afraid to express himself. She agrees to pose nude for him. He falls in love with her, which affects his marriage to Angela.

One day, Lily catches Gredin and Bridgette together. Feeling upset, she pierces her belly button and starts to rebel, thereby estranging herself from her friends. At a Halloween party, she enjoys the attention that she is getting from men, and she amuses herself; until she sees Gredin intimately dancing with another girl. Trying to make him jealous, she kisses a masked guy, who turns out to be Robert. She eventually has sex with Gredin, but he dumps her the next day. However, he explains that she has changed too much.

Meanwhile, Angela has found Donald's drawing of Lily and thinks that he is having an affair with her. Donald, already depressed since he saw Lily kissing Gredin, takes it out on Lily. He later claims that he is in love with her and tries to kiss her. She is initially unamused by his attempts, but they eventually engage in sexual activity. They are interrupted by the door buzzer, Lily leaves and is soon reunited with Gredin.

Not much later, Lily is invited for dinner with the Falk family during Thanksgiving and brings Gredin with her, which upsets Donald. After being asked to put Daphna to bed, she ends up in the hall alone with Donald and he forces himself upon her. She tries to stop him, but has no success. They are eventually caught in the act by Daphna; who runs away. As Daphna runs out of the home, Gredin sees the dishelved Lily and goes outside as Daphna is hit by a car.

Lily; who is traumatized by what happened that night, returns home and destroys everything that has to do with Ivy. She then showers and afterwards, Gredin arrives at Lily's place to reveal that Daphna has survived. A psychotic Donald knocks him out before he enters Lily's room and attacks her. Gredin tries to save her, but Donald beats him up and tries to stab him with scissors. As Lily runs away, Robert approaches Donald and claims that the police are on their way but is thrown down the stairs. Donald then follows Lily to the roof and falls to his death.

In the aftermath of the events, Lily contemplates dropping out of school and moving back to Michigan. However, Lily and Gredin say they love each other, and they decide to be with each other and Lily decides to stay in California.

Cast

Alyssa Milano as Lily Leonetti
Johnathon Schaech as Gredin
Xander Berkeley as Donald Falk
Belinda Bauer as Angela Falk
Camilla Belle as Daphna Falk
Kathryne Dora Brown as Tanya
Walter Kim as Robert
Victoria Haas as Bridgette
Tara Ellison as Catherine
Mychal Wilson as Spin
Joey Krees as Peter the Performance Artist
Kate Rodger as Isabel
Howard Brown as Rocco

Production 
The film is known as one of lead actress Alyssa Milano's attempts to break her child star image. She appeared in several soft erotic films, including Poison Ivy II. When this sequel was in production, Milano was cast because of her 'recognition factor'. Director Anne Goursaud worked previously with Milano on Embrace of the Vampire (1994), and they worried Poison Ivy II wouldn't be as daring as that film. They decided to go into another direction, not using Milano as the primary sex symbol in the film, but her co-star Johnathon Schaech.

Release

Home media
After the release, it was mostly promoted for the sex scenes featuring Milano. Goursaud admitted that the film mostly had a following with boys, but insisted that there were female fans as well. Although not as successful as Embrace of the Vampire, the film still did very well in home video sales. Critics, however, dismissed the film as softcore porn and it received mostly negative reviews.

Reception

Critical response
Review aggregator website Rotten Tomatoes reports that 14% of 7 critics gave the film a positive review, with an average rating of 3.66 out of ten.

References

External links

 
 
 

1996 films
1990s thriller drama films
1996 direct-to-video films
American independent films
American teen drama films
Films set in Los Angeles
Films shot in Los Angeles
Direct-to-video sequel films
American erotic thriller films
New Line Cinema direct-to-video films
1996 drama films
1990s English-language films
Films directed by Anne Goursaud
1990s American films